Iran participated in the 1994 Asian Games held in the city of Hiroshima. This country is ranked 6th with 9 gold medals in this edition of the Asiad.mu

Competitors

Medal summary

Medal table

Medalists

Results by event

Aquatics

Diving

Men

Swimming

Water polo 

Men

Athletics

Basketball

Men

Boxing 

Men

Cycling

Road
Men

Track
Men

Equestrian

Football 

Men

Judo

Karate

Men's kata

Shooting

Women

Taekwondo

Men

Tennis

Men

Volleyball

Men

Weightlifting

Wrestling 

Men's freestyle

Men's Greco-Roman

References

  Iran Olympic Committee - Asian Games Medalists
  Iran National Sports Organization - Asian Games Medalists

Nations at the 1994 Asian Games
1994
Asian Games